The Talcher–Kolar HVDC system, otherwise known as the East–South interconnection II is a 1450 km HVDC transmission connection between the eastern and southern regions in India connecting four states namely Odisha, Andhra Pradesh, Tamil Nadu and Karnataka.  The system has a transmission voltage of ±500 kV and was originally put into service in March 2003, with a rated power of 2000 MW.  In 2007 the scheme was upgraded to 2500 MW.

The Talcher–Kolar HVDC system is owned by Power Grid Corporation of India and the converter stations were built by Siemens.

The scheme is a conventional bipolar system with overhead lines for the high-voltage conductors and ground return for the neutral current.

Ground electrodes 

The scheme includes two ground electrodes, of ring construction, located at Rohila, 28.5 km northeast of the Talcher converter station and at Chikkadasarahalli, 30 km northwest of the Kolar converter station.

However, the soil conditions at some distance from the electrode at Chikkadasarahalli were later found to have higher than expected soil resistivity.  These geological effects gave rise to problems with DC currents flowing into the neutral connections of transformers at nearby AC substations, which required the addition of DC blocking devices.

Sites

References

External links 

 https://web.archive.org/web/20121013104458/http://www.powergridindia.com/PGCIL_NEW/home.aspx Power Grid Corporation of India
 http://www.energy.siemens.com/hq/en/power-transmission/hvdc/?stc=wwecc120599 Siemens HVDC website

2003 establishments in Orissa
HVDC transmission lines
Electric power transmission infrastructure in India
Converter stations
Energy in Odisha
Energy infrastructure completed in 2003